Reptiles of North America includes:

List of reptiles of Northern America
Middle America
List of reptiles of Mexico
List of reptiles of Guatemala
List of reptiles of Costa Rica
List of reptiles of Puerto Rico
List of reptiles of Martinique

See also
 List of amphibians of North America

Reptiles of North America